José Maria Alkmin (11 June 1901 – 22 April 1974) was the 15th vice president of Brazil from 1964 to 1967.

Alkmin was born in Bocaiúva. He served as Minister of Finance before becoming vice president. He was also once the Partido Social Democrático's deputy.  He died in Belo Horizonte, aged 72.

References 

1901 births
1974 deaths
People from Minas Gerais
Brazilian people of Lebanese descent
Social Democratic Party (Brazil, 1945–65) politicians
National Renewal Alliance politicians
Vice presidents of Brazil
Finance Ministers of Brazil
Members of the Chamber of Deputies (Brazil) from Minas Gerais
Brazilian people of Arab descent

Candidates for Vice President of Brazil